The Rhodothermaceae are a family of bacteria.

References

Bacteria families
Rhodothermota